Jabbertalky is a 1981 video game for DOS, Apple II and TRS-80 published by Automated Simulations.

Contents
Jabbertalky is programmable word game which includes three games and allows the player to create a vocabulary to use with these games.

Reception
Ron Boerger reviewed Jabbertalky in The Space Gamer No. 48. Boerger commented that "Unless you are (a) crazy about word games, (b) want to buy every game for the Apple, or (c) both of the above, don't waste your money on this one."

Marty Halpern reviewed the game for Computer Gaming World, and stated that "once you understand how the game functions, it really is quite simple. By the way, I've not revealed all of the Jabbertalker's secrets... these you must discover on your own. So, while I try to find Alice, why don't you just uncurl your cramped fingers from about that joystick, forget about the aliens or hidden treasure for a little while, and enter the world of the Jabbertalker."

References

External links
Review in SoftSide

1981 video games
Apple II games
DOS games
Educational video games
Epyx games
TRS-80 games
Video games developed in the United States
Word puzzle video games